Jan Kucharzewski (27 May 1876 in Wysokie Mazowieckie – 4 July 1952) was a Polish historian, lawyer, and politician. He was the prime minister of Poland from 1917 to 1918.

In 1898 he graduated from Warsaw University. He was a member of the Zet political organization, the National Democrats (Narodowa Demokracja) movement, and the National League (Liga Narodowa) until 1911. In the first years of World War I he resided in Switzerland, where he wrote articles for the Polish cause. In June 1917 he came back to Warsaw and received a job in the administration under the Regency Council. From 26 November 1917 till 27 February 1918 he was the Minister President of the Polish government. After 1920 he dedicated his life to scientific work. In 1940 (World War II) he went into exile in the US, where he published many works for the Polish cause, mainly from an anti-communist and anti-Soviet point of view.

Publications 
 Od białego do czerwonego caratu, (vol. 1–7, 1923–35)
 The origins of modern Russia, New York, 1948

1876 births
1952 deaths
People from Wysokie Mazowieckie
People from Łomża Governorate
Prime Ministers of Poland
People of the Kingdom of Poland (1917–1918)
Polish anti-communists
Association of the Polish Youth "Zet" members
20th-century Polish historians
Polish male non-fiction writers
20th-century Polish lawyers
Polish emigrants to the United States